Pournami (Full moon) was an Indian Telugu language soap opera directed by J N Raju premiered on 12 November 2018 and ended on 27 March 2021 aired on Gemini TV. The serial stars Rashmi Prabhakar, Ek Nadh, Kiran kanth as main protagonists and Samyuktha, Anil Allam and Bhavana in pivotal roles.

Plot
The show revolves around Pournami and her father. Pournami loses her mother at a very young age, which makes her father Chakravarthy, a widower. Chakravarthy disliked Pournami since her birth as he blames her for his wife's death and his wealth. Pournami craves for love and attention from her father. She hasn't received it from anyone. But, one day, her father asks her to leave the house. The rest of the series shows Pournami try whatever she can to win her father's heart over. Will Pournami win over her father's heart.

Cast
Rashmi Prabhakar as Pournami and vennela
Ek nadh as Pardhu (Pournami's husband)
Surya / RajKumar / Anil Allam as 
Chakravarthy (Pournami and Pavani's father)
Bhavana as Vasuki (Pavani's biological mother and Pournami's foster mother)
Kiran Kanth as Rakhi, Pavani's husband
Haritha as Vaidehi, Chakravarthi's sister 
Samyuktha as Pavani (Pournami's sister)
Amrutha as Maha (Pournami's cousin)
Suraj Krishna as Lokesh
Chalapathi Raju as Yogendra (Aishwarya's Father)
Aishwarya Raj / Preethi Varma as Aishwarya
Vinod Chakravarty as Ram
Sharif Vikram as Sonu
Ushasri as Chandrika, Sonu's mother
Raja Babu as Obul Reddy, Nalini Devi's step-brother
Naveena as Nalini Devi, Pardhu's mother
Shilpa Reddy as Parvathi, Pardhu's sister
Koteswara Rao as Rakhi's father
Nakshatra as Jyothi
Alapati Lakshmi as Vasuki's mother
G.S Hari as Vasuki's father
Seethamaalakshmi as Girija, Sonu's wife
Surekha Vani as Vasundhara, Pournami's biological mother (Deceased Died in serial)
Dubbing Janaki as Pournami's grand mother (deceased)

Adaptations

Crossover episodes
From 9 November 2020 to 12 November 2020 in episodes from 481 to 484 Pournami had a crossover with Bhagyarekha.

References

Indian television soap operas
Telugu-language television shows
2018 Indian television series debuts
Gemini TV original programming